Héctor González Garzón (born 7 July 1937, died 23 August 2015) was a Colombian former footballer. He was a member of the Colombia national football team at the 1962 FIFA World Cup in Chile, and he played in the team's 2nd and 3rd games against the Soviet Union and Yugoslavia.

References

1937 births
2015 deaths
Colombian footballers
Colombia international footballers
1962 FIFA World Cup players
Categoría Primera A players
Independiente Santa Fe footballers
Deportes Tolima footballers
Association football forwards